Liam Jewell (born March 19, 1968) is a Canadian sprint canoer who competed in the mid-1990s. He finished seventh in the K-4 1000 m event at the 1996 Summer Olympics in Atlanta.

References
Sports-Reference.com profile

1968 births
Canadian male canoeists
Canoeists at the 1996 Summer Olympics
Living people
Olympic canoeists of Canada
Place of birth missing (living people)
20th-century Canadian people